Jock Taylor (1954–1982) was a Scottish motorcycle sidecar racer.

Jock Taylor may also refer to:
Jock Taylor (footballer, born 1886) (1886–1916), played for Peterhead, Hull City, New Brompton and Leith Athletic
Jock Taylor (footballer, born 1909) (1909–1964), played for St Johnstone, Cowdenbeath, Raith Rovers, Bristol City, Halifax Town and Clapton Orient
Sir Jock Taylor (diplomat) (1924–2002), British diplomat

See also
John Taylor (disambiguation)